The Descubierta-class corvettes were a series of corvettes built for the Spanish Navy in the late 1970s and early 1980s. These ships were also sold to the Egyptian Navy and the Moroccan Navy. The ships were designed in cooperation with the German company Blohm & Voss, based on the s which were designed in the late 1960s for the Portuguese Navy, by the Portuguese naval engineer Rogério de Oliveira. A larger version was proposed for a second batch but the Spanish Navy chose to build the American s under licence instead.

Ships

Spanish Navy

Egyptian Navy

Royal Moroccan Navy
The Moroccan vessel is equipped with Exocet missiles instead of Harpoon missiles.

Gallery

See also
 List of naval ship classes in service

References
Citations

References
 

Ships of the Spanish Navy
Corvette classes
Corvettes of the Royal Moroccan Navy
Corvettes of the Spanish Navy
Corvettes of the Egyptian Navy